KNN College of Nursing, located at Yelahanka, Bangalore, was established in 2004 by a team headed by its current chairman, Dr. K.N. Satish. The institute offers all the available courses in nursing, namely, B.Sc (Nursing), M.Sc (Nursing), general nursing and midwifery, and Post Basic B.Sc. (Nursing). The master's degree is available in five specialties: psychiatry, pediatrics, obstetrics & gynecology, medical-surgical nursing.

The institute has entered into an exclusive memorandum of understanding with Columbia-Asia Hospitals such that the latter will recruit fresh graduates only from KNN College of Nursing, and in turn, Columbia-Asia Hospitals gets to train the students to its own standards.

References 

 http://www.school2college.com
 http://www.knneducation.com
 http://www.indiannursingcouncil.org

Colleges in Bangalore
Nursing schools in India
Educational institutions established in 2004
2004 establishments in Karnataka
Medical colleges in Karnataka